The following is a list of Denmark military equipment of World War II which includes artillery, vehicles and vessels. World War II was a global war that was under way by 1939 and ended in 1945.

Weapons 

 List of World War II weapons of Denmark

Aircraft 

 List of aircraft of Denmark in World War II

References

Military equipment of Denmark
Denmark in World War II
Military history articles needing attention only to referencing and citation